Labruguière (Languedocien: La Bruguièira) is a commune in the Tarn department in southern France.

The Thoré is a river that is part of the commune's eastern border, flows north-northwestward through the northern part of the commune, crosses the village, then forms part of its northern border.

Population
Its inhabitants are called Labruguiérois in French.

See also
Communes of the Tarn department

References

Communes of Tarn (department)